The Fryske Rie foar Heraldyk (The Frisian Heraldry Board) is an advisory committee that provides advice on the coat of arms and flags of the government, the province Friesland, the municipalities, the water boards, the town and village coat of arms and the existing family coat of arms. The Fryske Rie foar Heraldyk is not a government body and has no legal duties or powers.

The Rie is part of the Fryske Akademy in Leeuwarden.

External links 
 Fryske Rie foar Heraldyk on the Fryske Akademy site (in Dutch).

Heraldic societies
Organisations based in Friesland